The trampoline gymnastics tournaments at the 2017 World Games in Wrocław were contested between 24 and 26 July. 78 trampoline gymnastics competitors, from 22 nations, participated in the tournament. The trampoline gymnastics competition took place at Centennial Hall in Lower Silesian Voivodeship.

Schedule

Participating nations
The 78 trampoline gymnastics competitors, from 22 nations, participated in the tournament.

 (hosts)

Medal table

Events

Men

Women

See also
Gymnastics at the 2016 Summer Olympics
Trampoline World Championships

References

External links
 Fédération Internationale de Gymnastique
 Gymnastics on IWGA website
 Schedule
 Entry list
 Medalists
 Medals standing
 Results book

2017 World Games
World Games
2017
International gymnastics competitions hosted by Poland